Aleksandar Konov (born 3 September 1993) is a retired Bulgarian footballer who played as a goalkeeper.

Career
Konov joined Litex Lovech at academy level. He has been named on the Litex substitute bench for their fixture against Botev Plovdiv on 21 October 2012.

On 13 January 2013, Litex agreed for Konov to spend the rest of the season on loan to Vidima-Rakovski. He was first-choice goalkeeper during his loan-spell. In July 2013, Konov was loaned to Dobrudzha Dobrich for 2013–14 season.

Konov returned to Litex at the end of the season as second choice behind Vinícius Barrivieira. He was named on the bench for Litex's first seven games of the campaign and finally made his debut in the A Group on 14 September 2014, keeping a clean sheet against Haskovo at Lovech Stadium.

Dunav Ruse
On 12 June 2017 he left CSKA Sofia to join the other Bulgarian First League team of Dunav Ruse.

Lori
On 10 August 2018, Konov signed for newly promoted Armenian Premier League club Lori FC on a contract until the end of the year. On 11 December 2018, Konov extended his contract with Lori until the end of the 2018–19 season.
On 9 March 2019, Konov announced his retirement from football due to injury.

Club statistics

References

External links

1993 births
Living people
Bulgarian footballers
First Professional Football League (Bulgaria) players
PFC CSKA Sofia players
PFC Litex Lovech players
PFC Vidima-Rakovski Sevlievo players
PFC Dobrudzha Dobrich players
FC Dunav Ruse players
FC Oborishte players
Association football goalkeepers
FC Lori players
Sportspeople from Ruse, Bulgaria